alliantgroup is a national tax consulting services firm that works with CPA firms and their business clients to identify and claim available federal and state government-sponsored tax credits and incentives.

History 
alliantgroup was founded in 2002 by Dhaval Jadav and Shane Frank. Prior to alliantgroup, Jadav was an employee of Deloitte & Touche  and the Internal Revenue Service. Frank is a former lawyer. alliantgroup's founders noticed the lack of small and midsize businesses that were applying for the R&D tax credit that had been around since 1981, and began the firm in part to help more businesses take advantage of this type of credit.

In 2014, alliantgroup moved its headquarters to a LEED Platinum certified building in Houston, Texas that was designed by Kirksey Architecture. As of 2015, the company had over 600 employees in total. In 2016, roughly 460 employees were working at its Houston branch. The firm has employed people of varying roles and responsibilities including CPAs, engineers, chemists, biologists PhD's  and specialists in information technology.

On June 19, 2012, Bloomberg published an article stating that two whistleblowers had filed a claim with the Internal Revenue Service (IRS), alleging that alliantgroup had helped clients evade taxes. The claim was filed as part of the IRS's whistleblower program, in which informers could potentially earn a portion of the recovered funds if their claims are deemed to be true. In 2013, the IRS rejected the claim against alliantgroup.

As of 2017, alliantgroup had branches in New York, Chicago, Irvine, Boston, Sacramento, Indianapolis, Orlando and Washington, D.C.

Services 
alliantgroup assists companies in obtaining tax incentives for specific activities. According to their website, their core services have included:
 Employee Retention Credit (ERC)
 Research and Development Tax credit
Energy-efficient commercial building deduction - 179D    
Export incentives 
Hiring credits 
Government relations and tax advisory services

Notable employees and board members 
alliantgroup directors and board members have included individuals whose backgrounds include former congressmen and women, IRS and business executives: 
 Mark W. Everson joined alliantgroup as vice chairman after serving as Commissioner of the IRS under George W. Bush from 2003 to 2007.
 Prior to joining alliantgroup as national managing director, Dean Zerbe served as senior tax counsel for the U.S. Senate Finance Committee from 2001 to 2008. Zerbe has been profiled on Keith Olbermann’s MSNBC show for his comments on Wyclef Jean’s Haitian relief fund. 
 In 2010, alliantgroup announced that Jim Ramstad, former U.S. Congressman (Minnesota) would join the firm as a senior advisor.
 In August 2011, former U.S. Senator Kit Bond announced that he would be joining alliantgroup’s advisory board.
 In 2012, Bob Riley, former governor and U.S. Congressman (Alabama) joined alliantgroup as a director.
 In January 2014, it was announced that Steven T. Miller, former acting Commissioner of Internal Revenue would join alliantgroup as national director of tax issues. Miller resigned from the IRS in 2013.
 In May 2016, alliantgroup announced that former U.S. Congressman of New York, Rick Lazio was appointed as senior director of the firm.
 In June 2017, alliantgroup added former U.S. Secretary of Agriculture Mike Johanns as a chairman of agriculture.

Controversy 
In 2017 the University of Texas and University of Houston systems sued alliantgroup for racketeering. The suit alleged that Alliantgroup and an architectural firm hired by the universities, WHR Architects, Inc., conspired to reap more than $1.6 million in unauthorized tax benefits from the 2007 construction of the $5.5 million University of Houston Center, and the construction of an MD Anderson parking garage and a UT-Health Science Center project. United States District Judge David Hittner dismissed all claims against alliantgroup writing in his opinion, "Plaintiffs fail to sufficiently allege a concrete, definite, and tangible injury..." The University of Texas was also ordered to remit litigation costs to alliantgroup.

In May 2022, authorities from the IRS conducted an investigation at the building where alliantgroup is located.

References

External links
Official web site
alliantgroup News

Accounting firms of the United States